Great American Railroad Journeys  is a BBC travel documentary series presented by Michael Portillo and broadcast on BBC Two. Using an 1879 copy of Appleton's Guidebook to the railroads of the United States and Canada, Portillo travels across the United States and Canada primarily by train, though at times using other forms of transportation where necessary. On his journeys, he makes stops to learn how places, events and people, and the railroads of the 19th century influenced the country's growth into a major superpower. 

When originally broadcast, each series consisted of 30-minute episodes, shown on consecutive weekday evenings. , 4 series of the programme have been broadcast since its debut on 1 February 2016.

Episodes

Series 1 (2016)
In his first series, Portillo took two railroad journeys in the north-east of the United States, spanning a total of 15 episodes. His first journey took him across the US State of New York, travelling around New York City and Long Island before heading to Niagara Falls via New York's state capital of Albany and Buffalo. His second journey took him across the Mid-Atlantic States of Pennsylvania, Delaware, Maryland and Virginia, travelling from Philadelphia to Jamestown, via Washington, D.C.

Series 1 was repeated in July/August 2016 in a revised schedule (described as "Reversions") with two of the original 30-minute episodes merged, plus scenes not previously shown, to create a series of eight 60-minute episodes; as series 1 consisted of fifteen 30-minute episodes, the "Brooklyn to Montauk" episode was revised as an extended version that included additional content not seen in the original broadcast schedule. The Series 1 DVD contains only the original fifteen episodes.

New York City to Niagara Falls

Philadelphia to Jamestown

Series 2 (2017)
In his second series, Portillo took two railroad journeys around the midwestern and central regions of the United States, spanning a total of 20 episodes. His first recreated the experience that would have been felt by those travelling across the 19th century American Frontier, beginning in St. Louis, Missouri and travelling towards Kansas City, Dodge City, Colorado Springs, Albuquerque, and finishing at the Grand Canyon. His second focused on discovering how the modern Midwest was made, beginning in the Twin Cities and following the Mississippi River, before heading towards Chicago, and then turning back southwards towards Carbondale, eventually rejoining the Mississippi at the finishing point at Memphis.

Series 2 was repeated in April 2017 in a revised schedule (described as "Reversions") with two of the original 30-minute episodes merged, plus scenes not previously shown, to produce a series of ten 60-minute episodes.

St. Louis, Missouri to the Grand Canyon

The Twin Cities to Memphis

Series 3 (2018)
Series 3 was repeated in June 2018 in a revised schedule (described as "Reversions") with two of the original 30-minute episodes merged, plus scenes not previously shown, to produce a series of ten 60-minute episodes. The episode order was also changed, with the Reno to San Diego journey first, followed by that from Massachusetts to Toronto.

Series 4 (2020)

This is a re-edited version of Great Alaskan Railroad Journeys and Great Canadian Railway Journeys (both first shown in early 2019), with two of the original 30-minute episodes merged, plus scenes not previously shown, to produce each 60-minute programme. The titles in the opening sequences are unaltered, except for episode 3, for which the final episode of Great Alaskan Railroad Journeys was integrated with the 6th episode of Great Canadian Railway Journeys under the title Great Alaskan & Canadian Railway Journeys. Subsequent 30-minute episodes from Great Canadian Railway Journeys were combined in pairs, thus: 7+8, 9+10, 1+2, 3+4, 5+11, 12+13, 14+15.

Books
A book to accompany the series, written by Michael Portillo and published by Simon & Schuster UK, was released in February 2017.

Notes

References

External links
 
 
 BBC series to capture Village, Long Island Rail Road and American history  at The Garden City News
  BBC TV show filmed at Historical Society Museum at The Garden City News
 BBC Film Crew at NYS Capitol Tomorrow  at Capital Region Chamber

2016 British television series debuts
2010s British documentary television series
2010s British travel television series
2020s British documentary television series
2020s British travel television series
BBC television documentaries
BBC travel television series
Documentary television series about railway transport
English-language television shows
Television series by Fremantle (company)
Television shows set in the United States